Battle Taxi is a 1955 American aviation drama film directed by Herbert L. Strock and written by Malvin Wald. The film stars Sterling Hayden, Arthur Franz, Marshall Thompson, Leo Needham and Jay Barney. The film was released on January 26, 1955 by United Artists.

Plot
In the Korean War, Capt. Russ Edwards (Sterling Hayden), the commander of an Air Rescue helicopter team, must show Lt. Pete Stacy (Arthur Franz), a hot-shot former jet pilot how important helicopter rescue work is and turn him into a team player.

Lt. Col. Stoneham (Jay Barney), the overall commander of the unit, is worried that the rescue missions are being jeopardized by the number of helicopters out of service, and leans on Edwards to make his men aware that taking unnecessary risks is hurting their operational readiness. Despite the cautions, on the very next mission, Stacy and his copilot, 2nd Lt. Tim Vernon (Marshall Thompson) and Medic (Michael Colgan) put themselves and a rescued soldier in danger.  When the soldier tells them that his patrol is trapped by an enemy tank, Stacy does not wait for the jets on station to come in, but attacks the tank with only his flares, resulting in his helicopter being shot up and put out of commission.

Edwards tries to reinforce the message that the helicopter rescue is important and stations Stacy and his crew at the farthest base, near the enemy lines. Although Stacy accomplishes a risky rescue of a downed airman, his effort to bring back an airman unconscious in the sea, risks not only his life but all the men aboard his helicopter when he runs out of fuel. Stacy successfully pulls it off by refuelling from a damaged North Korean fuel truck but the fuel contaminates the engine and puts his helicopter out of commission.

The repaired helicopter is tested by Stacy and his crew but their test flight is interrupted by an emergency call where Stacy has to face not only the enemy but also rely on a helicopter rescue after he is seriously wounded and his helicopter is downed with the loss of the jet pilot that was just picked up. Edwards arrives to rescue everyone but calls in a jet fighter patrol to mop up an enemy force. When Stacy recovers, he is now convinced that his job is an essential one and that being part of a team is important.

Cast

 Sterling Hayden as Capt. Russ Edwards
 Arthur Franz as Lt. Pete Stacy
 Marshall Thompson as 2nd Lt. Tim Vernon
 Leo Needham as Sgt. "Slats" Klein
 Jay Barney as Lt. Col. Philip Stoneham
 John Dennis as MSgt. Joe Murdock
 Michael Colgan as Medic Capt. Larsen
 Andy Andrews as Lazy Joker Two
 Dale Hutchinson as Blue Boy Three-Gene 
 Robert Sherman as Lt. Joe Kirk
 Joel Marston as Lt. Marty Staple
 Vance Skarsted as Lt. Smiley Jackson
 Capt. Vincent H. McGovern as Harry, co-pilot

Production
Capt. Vincent H. McGovern who also appeared as Harry, one of the co-pilots, served as the technical advisor to the film. His background and experience with helicopter operations in Korea became essential to the production. The extensive use of combat footage of North American F-86 Sabre jet fighters, Sikorsky H-19 Chickasaw helicopters, SA-16A Albatross amphibians, and the Boeing SB-29 "Super Dumbo" Dumbo (air-sea rescue) aircraft made the film more authentic and realistic.

Reception
Despite the efforts of Ivan Tors to create a gripping war drama in Battle Taxi, the hackneyed plot made the film nothing more than a programmer. Film historian Stephen Pendo called it "... a poor account."

See also
List of American films of 1955

References

Notes

Bibliography

 Pendo, Stephen. Aviation in the Cinema. Lanham, Maryland: Scarecrow Press, 1985. .

External links
 

1955 films
American aviation films
Films directed by Herbert L. Strock
Films scored by Harry Sukman
United Artists films
American drama films
1955 drama films
Korean War aviation films
1950s English-language films
1950s American films
American black-and-white films